Pál Fischer (born 29 January 1966 in Pilisszántó) is a Hungarian retired football player.

Career
After playing initially with Ferencvárosi TC between 1984 and 1991. Fischer managed to be Hungarian national champion and league top scorer in 1992, a year after returning from a year-long loan at AFC Ajax where he was already Dutch Eredivisie champion in 1990. After this successful period he moved to BFC Siófok but after a year he signed with Kispest Honvéd where he was Hungarian champion again in 1993. Afterwards he returned to BFC Siofók in 1993, joined Soproni LC in 1994 before moving to Vasas SC in 1995 where he settled for two seasons. In 1997, he emigrated again, this time to play with Prva HNL club NK Osijek. After one season in Croatia he returned to Hungary and played with BKV Előre SC, III. Kerületi TUE and Magyargéc before retiring in 2003.

National team
He was part of the Hungary team that participated in the 1985 FIFA World Youth Championship.
Fischer was part of the Hungarian national team and played a total of 19 matches from 1988 until 1992.

Honours

Club
Ajax
 Eredivisie: 1989–90
 Ferencváros
 Magyar Kupa: 1990–91
Honvéd
 Nemzeti Bajnokság I: 1992–93

Individual
 Nemzeti Bajnokság I top goalscorer: 1991–92 (16 goals, together with Ferenc Orosz)

External links
 
 
 
 

1966 births
Living people
Hungarian footballers
Association football forwards
Hungary international footballers
Hungary youth international footballers
Ferencvárosi TC footballers
AFC Ajax players
BFC Siófok players
Budapest Honvéd FC players
Vasas SC players
NK Osijek players
BKV Előre SC footballers
III. Kerületi TUE footballers
Nemzeti Bajnokság I players
Eredivisie players
Croatian Football League players
Hungarian expatriate footballers
Expatriate footballers in the Netherlands
Expatriate footballers in Croatia
Hungarian expatriate sportspeople in the Netherlands
Hungarian expatriate sportspeople in Croatia